Muling Umawit ang Puso is a 1995 Filipino film and an official entry to the 1995 Metro Manila Film Festival.

Winner of eight awards at the 1995 Metro Manila Film Festival (including Best Picture, Director, Actress, Supporting Actor and Supporting Actress).

Synopsis

Cast
Nora Aunor as Loida Verrano
Donna Cruz as Noemi
Ian De Leon as Vincent
Ricky Davao as Tony Gallardo 
Albert Martinez as Miguel 
Rita Avila as Glenda Andrada
Michael De Mesa as Diosdado Rivera
Suzette Ranillo as Lani
Jennifer Sevilla as Karla
Mandy Ochoa as Michael
Luz Valdez as Gracia
Jim Pebangco as Badong
Lucita Soriano as Mameng

Awards

References

External links

1995 films
Filipino-language films
Films set in the Philippines
Philippine musical drama films
Films directed by Joel Lamangan